Merve Dinçel (born 1999) is a Turkish taekwondo athlete.

Career 
Merve Dinçel has won a gold medal at the World Taekwondo Women's Open Championships held in Saudi Arabia's capital Riyadh. She won the gold medal in the women's 49 kg event at the 2022 European Taekwondo Championships held in Manchester, England.

She won the gold medal in the women's 49 kg event at the 2022 Mediterranean Games held in Oran, Algeria.

Tournament record

References

External links
 

Living people
1999 births
Turkish female taekwondo practitioners
European Taekwondo Championships medalists
Competitors at the 2022 Mediterranean Games
Mediterranean Games gold medalists for Turkey
Mediterranean Games medalists in taekwondo
21st-century Turkish women